In This Corner is a 1986 Canadian television film, directed by Atom Egoyan. The film stars Robert Wisden as Terry Dunne, an amateur boxer from Canada who becomes an unwitting pawn in The Troubles when he is convinced by Irish Republican Army operatives to help smuggle accused terrorist Ryan Shaw (Patrick Tierney) back into Ireland as part of his entourage when he travels there for a title bout.

The film's cast also includes Neil Munro, Brenda Bazinet, Cedric Smith, Sean McCann and Stephen Ouimette.

The film aired on CBC Television on February 2, 1986. The film received a Gemini Award nomination for Best Short Drama at the 1st Gemini Awards.

References

External links
In This Corner at IMDb
In This Corner at BFI

1986 films
CBC Television original films
Films directed by Atom Egoyan
Canadian drama television films
English-language Canadian films
Films about The Troubles (Northern Ireland)
Canadian boxing films
1980s English-language films
1980s Canadian films